Haman Jo clan is one of Korean clans. Their Bon-gwan is in Haman County, South Gyeongsang Province. According to the research held in 2015, the number of Haman Jo clan was 282890. Their founder was  who was a chief vassal in Goryeo. He was a descendant of a royal family in Zhao (state). He went to Korea, and contributed to founding Goryeo. He was awarded Gongsin and Four-star rank.

See also 
 Korean clan names of foreign origin

References

External links 
 

 
Jo clans
Korean clan names of Chinese origin